In algebraic geometry, the conchoids of de Sluze are a family of plane curves studied in 1662 by Walloon mathematician René François Walter, baron de Sluze.

The curves are defined by the polar equation

In cartesian coordinates, the curves satisfy the implicit equation

except that for  the implicit form has an acnode  not present in polar form.

They are rational, circular, cubic plane curves.

These expressions have an asymptote  (for ).

 
 
If , the curve will have a loop. The area of the loop is

Four of the family have names of their own:
, line (asymptote to the rest of the family)
, cissoid of Diocles 
, right strophoid
, trisectrix of Maclaurin

References

Plane curves
Algebraic curves